

Events

Births

Deaths
 Marquis Zhao of Jin, Ruler of the state of Jin

References

730s BC